Augustin Theiner, Cong.Orat., (11 April 1804, in Breslau – 8 August 1874, in Civitavecchia) was a German theologian and historian.

He was the son of a shoemaker. As a boy, he was a pupil at the gymnasium of St. Mathias at Breslau, Silesia, then in the Kingdom of Prussia, and studied theology in the same city. Together with his brother Anthony he wrote, Einfuhrung der erzwungenen Ehelosigkeit bei den Geistlichen (1828). At the advice of this brother he abandoned theology and turned his attention to law, which he studied at Breslau and Halle, and in 1829 he obtained a degree in law at the latter university. He then received a scholarship from the Prussian Government, which enabled him to make researches in Belgium, England, and France as to the sources of Canon law. He finally went to Rome, where he settled permanently.

Here, under the influence of Count Reisach, then rector of the Propaganda and later cardinal, the change in his opinions was completed. In 1835, he wrote the Geschichte der geistlichen Bildungsanstalten, and in 1836 the Disquisitiones criticae, on the sources of canon law. Soon after this he became a priest and entered the Oratory of St. Philip Neri.

In the succeeding years he wrote the following works:
Die neuesten Zustände der kath. Kirche in Polen und Russland (1841)
Die Rückkehr der regierenden Hauser Braunschweig und Sachsen zur kath. Kirche (1843)
Zustände der kath. Kirche in Schlesien 1740-58 (1846)
Kardinal Frankenberg (1850)

He was commissioned by Pope Pius IX, who had given him a position in the Vatican Library in 1850, to write the Geschichte des Pontifikats Klemens XIV (1853; Italian translation, 1855). In this work he showed himself an opponent of the Jesuits, with whom he had been on good terms until 1844, so that the work was forbidden in the States of the Church.

In 1855, Pius IX appointed Theiner as Prefect of the Vatican secret archives. He now published his collections of authorities drawn from these:

Die Fortsetzung der Annalen des Baronius (3 vols., 1856)
Vetera monumenta Hungariae (2 vols., 1859–60)
Poloniae et Lithuaniae (4 vols., 1860–64)
Slavorum meridionalium (2 vols., 1863)
Hibernorum et Scotorum (1864)
Codex dominii temporalis apostolicae sedis (3 vols., 1861–62)
Monumenta spectantia ad unionem ecclesiarum Graecae et Romanae (1872).

Both before and during the First Vatican Council he was in close connection with the opponents of papal infallibility. Because he communicated to them the order of business of the Council, that had been kept secret, he was deposed from his dignities and offices.

Whether he died at peace with the Church is questionable. His correspondence with the Old Catholic scholar, Johann Friedrich, during the years 1870-73 shows that he held the same views as the latter; on the other hand Count Hermann Stainlein asserts that he knew Theiner during this period as a loyal Catholic priest. In any event, he was buried at the Teutonic Cemetery, adjacent to St. Peter's Basilica, which is reserved for German-speaking residents of the city in service to the institutions of the Catholic Church.

There is no doubt as to his large scholarship and his services to history. After his death appeared the work, Acta genuina Concilii Tridentini (1874), very imperfectly edited.

Works

References

1804 births
1874 deaths
19th-century German historians
Historians of the Catholic Church
Clergy from Wrocław
19th-century German Roman Catholic priests
Burials at the Teutonic Cemetery
Oratorians
Prefects of the Vatican Secret Archives
Martin Luther University of Halle-Wittenberg alumni
People from the Province of Silesia
German male non-fiction writers